Barbasphecia ares is a moth of the family Sesiidae. It is typically found in Ghana.

References

Endemic fauna of Ghana
Sesiidae
Insects of West Africa
Moths of Africa
Moths described in 2011